
Gmina Zduny is a rural gmina (administrative district) in Łowicz County, Łódź Voivodeship, in central Poland.

Villages
Gmina Zduny contains the villages and settlements of Bąków Dolny, Bąków Górny, Bogoria Dolna, Bogoria Górna, Bogoria Pofolwarczna, Dąbrowa, Jackowice, Łaźniki, Maurzyce, Nowy Złaków, Pólka, Retki, Rząśno, Strugienice, Szymanowice, Urzecze, Wierznowice, Wiskienica Dolna, Wiskienica Górna, Zalesie, Zduny, Złaków Borowy and Złaków Kościelny.

Neighbouring gminas
Gmina Zduny is bordered by the gminas of Bedlno, Bielawy, Chąśno, Kiernozia, Łowicz and Żychlin.

References
 Polish official population figures 2006

Zduny
Łowicz County